David Geoffrey Allen (born 23 December 1955, in Kendal, Cumbria)
is an English musician, formerly the bass guitarist for the post-punk band Gang of Four. In 1981, he left Gang of Four to form Shriekback.

He later founded World Domination Recordings and participated in two bands who recorded for the label. Allen was the vocalist and primary songwriter for The Elastic Purejoy, and played bass guitar in Low Pop Suicide which was fronted by Rick Boston. He appeared on several LPs and EPs with each of these bands, though his ambitious plan to release a work of 20 volumes produced only three releases, The Harvest and the Elastic Purejoy's The Clutter of Pop and Talk Radio.  After leaving Shriekback in 1988, Allen founded King Swamp with other former bandmates. According to Pitchfork.com, in 2006, Allen formed a "super-group" under the name Faux Hoax (supposedly pronounced 'Folks') with Danny Seim of Menomena, John Askew of Tracker, and Pioneers Press author Adam Gnade. A 7" single, "Your Friends Will Carry You Home," featuring Gnade on vocals, was released by Polyvinyl records in 2008.

Subsequently, he was director of Consumer Digital Audio Services at Intel in Portland, Oregon. Then he went on to be the president of the entertainment division of the Overland Agency, an advertising firm based in Portland. He is now co-founder of digital strategy firm Fight, and runs the independent record label, Pampelmoose. In 2014, he joined Beats Music as Director, Artist & Music Industry Advocacy. After Apple Inc. acquired Beats, he stayed on in Apple Music Artist Relations.

References

1955 births
Living people
English rock bass guitarists
Male bass guitarists
People from Kendal
British post-punk musicians
English record producers
Gang of Four (band) members
English new wave musicians